John Mayall & the Bluesbreakers are an English blues rock band led by singer, songwriter, and multi-instrumentalist John Mayall. The band has been influential as an incubator for British rock and blues musicians. Many of the best known bands to come out of Britain in the 1960s and 1970s had members that came through the Bluesbreakers at one time, forming the foundation of British blues music that is still played heavily on classic rock radio.  Among those with a tenure in the Bluesbreakers are Eric Clapton and Jack Bruce (both later of Cream), Peter Green, Mick Fleetwood, and John McVie (the three of whom would form Fleetwood Mac), Mick Taylor (the Rolling Stones), Aynsley Dunbar (Frank Zappa, The Mothers of Invention), Jon Hiseman, Dick Heckstall-Smith and Tony Reeves (these three would form Colosseum), and numerous others.  

Mayall used the band name between 1963 and 1967, then dropped it for some fifteen years. In 1982 a 'Return of the Bluesbreakers' was announced, and the name was used until the band again dissolved in 2008. The name has become generic, without a clear distinction between recordings by Mayall alone and those by Mayall and his band.

History
The band that would evolve to the Bluesbreakers in 1965 was formed in February 1963 and became an ever-evolving lineup of more than 100 combinations of musicians performing under the name.
Eric Clapton joined in April 1965, a few months after the release of their first album. Clapton brought guitar-led blues influences to the forefront of the group; he had left The Yardbirds in order to concentrate on the blues.

The first single released by John Mayall and his band, in May 1964, was the song "Crawling Up a Hill", with "Mr. James" as the b-side. The band on the single were Peter Ward, John McVie on bass, Bernie Watson on guitar, and Martin Hart on drums. After the release, Watson was replaced by Roger Dean, and Hart by Hughie Flint. This lineup played on the album John Mayall Plays John Mayall, recorded in December 1964 and released in 1965. After this, the band released a single called "Crocodile Walk", with "Blues City Shakedown" as the b-side, which was produced by Tony Clarke of Decca Records. Dean then left the group and was replaced by Clapton.

The group lost their record contract with Decca that year, which also saw the release of a single called "I'm Your Witchdoctor" (produced by Jimmy Page) in October 1965, the first credited to John Mayall & the Bluesbreakers, followed by a return to Decca in 1966. Then in August 1966 John Mayall and Eric Clapton released the single "Lonely Years", with the b-side "Bernard Jenkins", which was released by Purdah Records. The album Blues Breakers with Eric Clapton was released in July; it reached the Top Ten in the UK.

Shortly after Blues Breakers with Eric Clapton was released, Eric Clapton saw Buddy Guy in concert, and being impressed by his trio, the idea for Cream was formed, and he left to form this new group with Ginger Baker and Jack Bruce. Clapton was replaced by Peter Green for the album A Hard Road, which was recorded with McVie on bass and Aynsley Dunbar on drums. Then the same line-up served as backing band for the album Eddie Boyd and His Blues Band Featuring Peter Green. After this, Green left to form Fleetwood Mac.

Mick Taylor then joined the group, and they recorded Crusade on 12 July 1967. Soon after, McVie joined Fleetwood Mac and was replaced by Tony Reeves for the album Bare Wires, which was their highest-charting UK album. Then Reeves, Dick Heckstall-Smith and Jon Hiseman left to form Colosseum. Following a further album, Blues from Laurel Canyon, Taylor then left to join the Rolling Stones, and the name "Bluesbreakers" was dropped from John Mayall albums.

By the time the 1960s were over, the Bluesbreakers had finally achieved some success in the United States.

With some interruptions, the Bluesbreakers have continued to tour and release albums (over 50 to date), though they never achieved the critical or popular acclaim of their earlier material. In 2003, Eric Clapton, Mick Taylor and Chris Barber reunited with the band for John Mayall's 70th Birthday Concert in Liverpool—the concert was later released on CD and DVD. In 2004, their lineup included Buddy Whittington, Joe Yuele, Hank Van Sickle and Tom Canning, and the band toured the UK with Mick Taylor as a guest musician.

In November 2008, Mayall announced on his website he was disbanding the Bluesbreakers, to cut back on his heavy workload and give himself freedom to work with other musicians. A 2009 solo tour with Rocky Athas (formerly of Black Oak Arkansas) was the first musical venture Mayall undertook after disbanding the band. Former band member Johnny Almond died on 18 November 2009 from cancer, aged 63.

In 2009, Eagle Records asked Mayall for a new album, and he put together a solo band including Rocky Athas (guitar), Tom Canning (keyboard), Greg Rzab (bass) and Jay Davenport (percussion) and produced the album Tough the same year. After a year, Canning left because of other priorities.

Members

Main lineup
John Mayall – vocals, keyboards, harmonica, rhythm guitar (1963–present)
Jay Davenport – drums, percussion (2009–present)
Greg Rzab – bass, double bass (1999–2000, 2009–present)
Carolyn Wonderland – lead guitar, vocals (2018–present)

Discography

Studio albums

See also
 :Category: John Mayall & the Bluesbreakers albums
 Marshall Bluesbreaker

References

External links
Official John Mayall website
John Mayall Interview with Jarrod Dicker (2009)
  John Mayall Interview (2010) published in the magazine Guitar Part

John Mayall
English blues musical groups
Eric Clapton
Decca Records artists
British rhythm and blues boom musicians
English blues rock musical groups
Musical groups established in 1963
Musical groups disestablished in 2008
Musical groups reestablished in 2020